Sărățeni is a commune in Mureș County, Transylvania, Romania. It became an independent commune when it split from the town of Sovata in 2004. The commune, composed of a single village, Sărățeni, has an absolute Hungarian majority (82%).

It is the location of Castra of Sărățeni, a Roman fort.

See also
 List of Hungarian exonyms (Mureș County)

References

Communes in Mureș County
Localities in Transylvania